Arrow Air was a passenger and cargo airline based in Building 712 on the grounds of Miami International Airport (MIA) in an unincorporated area of Miami-Dade County, Florida. At different times over the years, it operated over 90 weekly scheduled cargo flights, had a strong charter business and at one point operated scheduled international and domestic passenger flights. Its main base was Miami International Airport. Arrow Air ceased operations on June 29, 2010, and filed for Chapter 11 bankruptcy protection on July 1, 2010. It was then liquidated.

History

California origins
Arrow Air founder George E. Batchelor was born of Native American ancestry in Shawnee, Oklahoma, in 1920. He became a pilot, and the loss of his first wife and son in a plane crash did not stop him from moving to Compton, California, in 1947 and establishing Arrow Air. The carrier established its base at Torrance Municipal Airport, Torrance, California, from where it operated Douglas DC-3s on passenger and cargo services within the state. The airline halted scheduled operations in 1953 due to Batchelor's perception of an anti-competitive regulatory environment in the air transport business. However, Batchelor continued leasing aircraft, often with crews, to other small airlines.

Batchelor moved Arrow Air to South Florida in 1964. Considered a pioneer in both south Florida's aviation industry and in the Latin American air cargo market, Batchelor would amass a considerable fortune and donate much of it to homeless and children's causes before dying in July 2002.

Relaunched in 1981

On May 26, 1981, Arrow Air relaunched as a charter airline under Miami's Batchelor Enterprises, whose aviation operations included fixed-base operator (FBO) Batch Air and International Air Leases, Inc., Arrow's parent company. (Batch Air eventually became owned by an employee group and was sold to Greenwich Air in 1987 for more than $30 million.) Arrow added scheduled passenger services in April 1982, beginning with California-Montego Bay.

Low fares were causing the company to lose money. In October 1984, it canceled several routes, including Tampa–London. At the same time, the company reoriented its route structure from an east–west alignment to a north–south one, reported Aviation Week & Space Technology. San Juan, Puerto Rico, where the company was building a new hub, was the center of the scheduled network, and by the end of 1985 Arrow Air was flying between SJU and Aguadilla, Puerto Rico, Montreal, Toronto, New York, Philadelphia, Boston, Baltimore, Orlando and Miami. In 1985, more than one million people flew onboard Arrow Air to 245 destinations in 72 countries with the majority of these flights being unscheduled charter service.

Arrow Air was operating Douglas DC-8 and wide-body McDonnell Douglas DC-10 aircraft at this time. Like other start-ups, Arrow contracted some functions to other airlines. United Airlines trained Arrow Air crews in Denver, and Florida Air supplemented Batch-Air's maintenance work.

The company was approved for military charters in 1984, and in October 1985 won a $13.8 million contract with the Department of Defense. This accounted for only a small segment of Arrow's revenues. Most of its business came from scheduled service from Canada and the East Coast to Puerto Rico and Mexico. Commercial charters accounted for another 20 percent or so.

In carrying out its military flights, the airline experienced a large-scale disaster and its second fatal accident and first since the airline's relaunch. On December 12, 1985, one of the company's DC-8s crashed after takeoff in Gander, Newfoundland, killing 248 soldiers of the 101st Airborne Division and eight of Arrow's flight crew personnel. The flight had originated in Cairo and had taken on fuel in Gander after stopping in Cologne, West Germany. The accident resulted in a great deal of unfavorable media coverage and government scrutiny for the airline. Arrow filed for Chapter 11 bankruptcy reorganization on February 11, 1986, laying off 400 employees. However, operations continued.

Richard Haberly was named president of Arrow Air in 1987. Arrow's wet lease business—the practice of hiring out planes complete with crews and fuel—began to pick up again. In 1987, Arrow began leasing a DC-8 to LOT Polish Airlines for a Warsaw–New York–Chicago route. It also provided a long-range Douglas DC-8-62CF jet to Air Marshall Islands which was operated in a mixed passenger/freight combi aircraft configuration on flights linking several remote Pacific islands with Honolulu. In early 1991, Arrow was again carrying U.S. troops, this time for the military buildup preceding the war in the Persian Gulf.

Arrow boasted a 98 percent on-time rate and a high degree of customer loyalty. Rates for Latin American cargo fell 15 percent in the early 1990s as U.S. passenger airlines United Airlines and American Airlines paid increased attention to that market. After a few profitable years, Arrow posted losses in 1992 and 1993. Richard Haberly was succeeded as Arrow president in June 1994 by Jonathan D. Batchelor, stepson of chairman and company founder George Batchelor.

In the mid-1990s, Arrow's fleet numbered 18 aircraft including Douglas DC-8s and Boeing 727-200s (two of which were configured for passengers). Many of the planes were acquired from bankrupt Eastern Air Lines. The company removed the Boeing 727s from the fleet and began leasing Lockheed L-1011 wide-body jets in 1996 when its fleet numbered just nine aircraft. By this time, charter flights for other airlines were accounting for half of Arrow's business.

Grounded in 1995

Market conditions were not Arrow's only worries. The Federal Aviation Administration (FAA) grounded Arrow in March 1995, charging the carrier had improperly documented maintenance. A company spokesman countered that the grounding was unfair and was related simply to the FAA's request that Arrow prints out a hard copy of its fleet records, which were stored electronically. Company officials blamed the affair on a disgruntled employee who had been fired for theft.

Arrow contracted other carriers to handle its business during the crisis. British Airways, for example, handled the route between Columbus, Ohio, and Glasgow, Scotland. Arrow also laid off 368 of its 587 employees. During the shutdown, Arrow lost $3.5 million, plus another $1.5 million in FAA fines.

The FAA allowed the company to begin flying cargo again in June 1995. Soon, Arrow was carrying more international freight at Miami International Airport than any other carrier. It was connecting San Juan to the Northeast via Hartford, Connecticut; to the Midwest via Columbus, Ohio; and to the Southeast via Atlanta.

A restructuring in June 1996 placed Terence Fensome as president and CEO of Arrow Air. Jonathan Batchelor soon took over again as president, but in July 1998 relinquished that role for the positions of chairman and CEO as Guillermo J. "Willy" Cabeza became president and chief operating officer. Cabeza had been vice-president of operations at Arrow.

Arrow failed to profit from the upswing in the economy in 1997. It lost $15.1 million for the year on revenues of $88.3 million. The company had posted losses of $11.3 million in 1996 on revenues of $61.1 million.

Arrow started a new weekly service from Houston to Peru and Ecuador in February 1998. Houston was billing itself as a "Gateway to Latin America" to compete with Miami, which handled 85 percent of cargo traffic to the region. Arrow revenues were $87 million in fiscal 1998.

A merger and a bankruptcy: 1999–2004

After a few difficult years, Arrow was acquired by Fine Air Services in early 1999 (the deal was finalized in April) from International Air Leases Inc. for $115 million. Frank and Barry Fine, owners of Fine Air, planned to keep Arrow's brand name viable and continued to emphasize scheduled, rather than charter, cargo service. Included in the purchase were 13 Douglas DC-8 jets, four Lockheed L-1011 wide-body jets, 130 jet engines, and spare parts. The buy gave Arrow access to Fine's  refrigerated distribution facility for handling perishables, which made up the bulk of Latin American cargo.

Unfortunately, Fine Air had its own set of woes resulting from a fatal crash of one of its DC-8s in August 1997. This scuttled Fine's planned $123 million initial public offerings. Rising fuel costs, a downturn in the Latin American market, and debt left over from its Arrow Air acquisition combined to make the airline unflyable. Fine lost $108 million in 2000 on revenues of $152 million, and another $36 million on 2001 revenues of $148 million.

The company filed for bankruptcy on September 27, 2000, and subsequently merged with Arrow Air, Inc., leaving behind the Fine Air Services name. The Fine family would no longer control the company. It emerged from Chapter 11 in May 2002 as a unit of Arrow Air Holdings Corp., a Greenwich, Connecticut, investment group led by Dort Cameron.

Revenues were $148 million in 2001 when Arrow had about 800 employees in Miami and another 200 in other locations. The fleet had grown to 16 DC-8s and two Lockheed L-1011s; the carrier had also begun leasing a pair of McDonnell Douglas DC-10s.

The new Arrow was losing $3 million a month, reported Traffic World in early 2002, yet the company aimed to break even by year-end. The withdrawal of Grupo TACA's freighters from the market provided Arrow with an opportunity to expand services in Central America with some east–west routes. Arrow re-entered the charter business and diversified geographically via partnerships with airlines such as Atlas Air, Lloyd Aéreo Boliviano, and Air Global International (AGI). AGI had been formed in 2001 and leased two Boeing 747s to carry cargo to South America. Its routes complemented those of Arrow Air, which acquired AGI in March 2002. Operationally, Arrow Air planned to retire its Lockheed L-1011 by 2003 and replace its dozen DC-8s with DC-10s a few years after. In January 2004 Arrow Air filed for Chapter 11 bankruptcy protection, but exited in June 2004 after a bankruptcy court approved its restructuring.

Arrow Cargo's strategic alliance

In March 2008, Arrow announced that it entered into a strategic alliance with the firm known as MatlinPatterson Global Opportunities, a private equity investment fund which formerly controlled the Brazilian company Varig Log along with the rebranded ATA Holdings (the parent company of ATA Airlines) which has now been renamed Global Aviation Holdings. As of April, indications were MatlinPatterson would be shuttering Arrow Cargo.

End of operations
Arrow Cargo ceased scheduled operations on June 30, 2010. After failing to find a buyer, the company was liquidated.

Transatlantic and South American routes in 1983-84

According to the worldwide edition of the Official Airline Guide (OAG), in 1983 Arrow Air was operating scheduled passenger service with stretched Super DC-8 jets between the U.S. and Europe including nonstop flights between London Gatwick Airport (LGW) and both Denver (DEN) and Tampa (TPA) and also direct between Miami (MIA) and both London Gatwick Airport and Amsterdam (AMS) as well as direct between Tampa and Amsterdam.  Also according to the OAG, the airline was flying Boeing 707 passenger service nonstop between New York JFK Airport and Georgetown, Guyana at this time.  By 1984, Arrow Air was operating nonstop Super DC-8 service between  San Juan (SJU) and Amsterdam (AMS) in conjunction with Surinam Airways which was flying connecting service between San Juan and its home base at Paramaribo at the time. None of these flights were operated on a daily basis but were instead primarily flown several days a week.

Destinations
The November 14, 1985, Arrow Air system timetable listed the following destinations.  The airline was operating Boeing 727-200, stretched Super Douglas DC-8 and wide body McDonnell Douglas DC-10 jetliners in scheduled passenger service at this time.

 Aguadilla, PR (BQN) 
 Baltimore, MD (BWI)
 Boston, MA (BOS)
 Orlando, FL (MCO)
 Miami, FL (MIA)
 Montreal, QC (YUL)
 New York, NY - JFK Airport (JFK)
 Philadelphia, PA (PHL)
 San Juan, PR (SJU) - Hub
 Toronto, ON (YYZ)

The route map accompanying the above referenced Arrow Air timetable lists San Juan, Puerto Rico as a hub at this time with nonstop service to and from Baltimore, Miami, Montreal, New York City, Orlando, Philadelphia, and Toronto, and direct one-stop service to and from Boston.

This same Arrow Air timetable also lists the following new destinations that were to begin receiving scheduled passenger service on December 13, 1985:

 Cancun, Mexico (CUN)
 Caracas, Venezuela (CCS)
 Cozumel, Mexico (CZM)
 Merida, Mexico (MID)
 Tampa, FL (TPA)

Cargo destinations in 2005
Cargo Solutions (cargo routes & schedules)

Arrow Air operated the following freight services (at January 2005):

Domestic scheduled destinations
 Atlanta (ATL)
 San Juan, Puerto Rico (SJU)
 Miami (MIA)

International scheduled destinations
 Mérida (MID)
 Iquitos (IQT)
 Bogotá (BOG)
 Lima (LIM)
 Panama City (PTY)
 San José (SJO)
 Santo Domingo (SDQ)
 Santiago (SCL)
 Port au Prince (PAP)

Scheduled destinations of Arrow Air, Inc. dba Arrow Cargo
Canada
Windsor
Central America
Guatemala City
El Salvador
San Pedro Sula, Honduras
Managua, Nicaragua
San José, Costa Rica
Panama City
South America
Bogotá
Medellin
Cali
Ciudad del Este
Guayaquil
Iquitos
Lima
Manaus
Quito
Salvador, Brazil
Santiago, Chile
São Paulo
Recife
Campinas

Fleet

Final fleet

The Arrow Cargo fleet includes the following aircraft (at Aug 1, 2009):

Retired fleet

Over the years, Arrow Air had in the past operated a variety of aircraft, including:

Livery
The livery used when the airline was operating as Arrow Air had a large dark blue 'A' on the aircraft tail, one end of which extended into a line along the fuselage below the window-level and to the nose below the cockpit windows.  The remainder of the aircraft was white, with "Arrow Air" titles above the windows forward in red. At the time Arrow Cargo ceased operating, its livery consisted of a white fuselage forward, with blue and green to the rear of the aircraft, and with "Arrow Cargo" titles in green accompanied by a blue logo near the front. N140WE was an Arrow Air plane that was painted all white.

Accidents and incidents
December 7, 1949: An Arrow Air Douglas DC-3 (registered N60256), en route from Oakland to Sacramento, flew into the ground near Benicia, California, during bad weather.  All aboard (six passengers and three flight crew) were killed, including Batchelor's 26-year-old wife, Lorraine, and 2-year-old son, George.  The plane crashed into terrain at 800 feet elevation when its reported altitude was 4,000 feet;  it was never determined whether the crash was due to pilot error or an instrument malfunction.
December 12, 1985: An Arrow Air Douglas DC-8-63CF (registered N950JW), operating as Arrow Air Flight 1285, carrying American military personnel on a charter flight home for Christmas, crashed in Newfoundland, killing all 248 passengers on board and 8 crew members.
 On February 28, 2002, Arrow Air Flight P6L, a Douglas DC-8-62F operated by Arrow Air (registered N1808E) touched down at Singapore Changi Airport. The tower instructed the aircraft to park at Bay 117. Instead, the aircraft turned right into a grassy area and fell into a ditch where the main landing gears broke off from the aircraft.
On December 13, 2002, Arrow Air Flight P5L, a Douglas DC-8-62F operated by Arrow Air (registered N1804) flying from Yokota Air Force Base in Japan was approaching runway 20R at Singapore Changi Airport. Due to a miscommunication between the First Officer and Captain during landing, when the aircraft touched down only about 1,500 m of the runway was available. The aircraft overran the runway and came to rest about 300 m from its end.
 In 2004, a former Arrow Air Lockheed L-1011 TriStar that was stored at Miami International Airport was damaged by a hurricane. The aircraft had been retired and was waiting for a new operator.
June 4, 2006: A McDonnell Douglas DC-10-10F (registered N68047) en route from Miami to Managua touched down fast at Managua and was unable to stop before the end of the runway. The front landing gear collapsed, which led to substantial damage to the engines on the wing of the aircraft as well as a rupture in a fuel tank.
On March 26, 2009, Arrow Air Flight 431, a McDonnell Douglas DC-10F, (registered N526MD), en route Manaus-Bogotá lost parts of an engine whilst flying over Manaus. The engine parts fell into the city, damaging 12 houses. The aircraft managed to land safely at El Dorado International Airport, Bogotá, Colombia. No one was injured or killed in this incident.

See also
 List of defunct airlines of the United States

References

External links

Arrow Cargo
Two Mundos Magazine Featuring Arrow Air Former CEO, Guillermo Cabeza

 
Airlines based in Florida
Airlines established in 1947
Airlines disestablished in 2010
Defunct cargo airlines
Companies based in Miami-Dade County, Florida
Companies that filed for Chapter 11 bankruptcy in 1986
Companies that filed for Chapter 11 bankruptcy in 2002
Companies that filed for Chapter 11 bankruptcy in 2004
Companies that filed for Chapter 11 bankruptcy in 2010
Defunct airlines of the United States
Defunct companies based in Florida
Privately held companies based in Florida
1947 establishments in Florida
Cargo airlines of the United States
2010 disestablishments in Florida
Defunct charter airlines of the United States